The 1984 Hi-Tec Women's British Open Squash Championships was held at the Wembley Squash Centre in London from 4–10 April 1984. Susan Devoy won her first title defeating Lisa Opie in the final.

Seeds

Draw and results

First round

Second round

Third round

Quarter-finals

Semi-finals

Final

References

Women's British Open Squash Championships
Women's British Open Squash Championship
Women's British Open Squash Championship
Squash competitions in London
Women's British Open Squash Championship
British Open Squash Championship
Women's British Open Squash Championship